James William Haines (born 20 December 1945) is a former Australian rules footballer who played with South Melbourne in the Victorian Football League (VFL).

Notes

External links 

Jim Haines's playing statistics from WAFL Footy Facts

Living people
1945 births
Australian rules footballers from Western Australia
Sydney Swans players
East Perth Football Club players